El Cid, or Rodrigo Diaz de Vivar, was a medieval Spanish hero.

El Cid may also refer to:

 Cantar de mio Cid, a medieval Spanish epic poem
 Le Cid, a 1636 tragicomedy written by Pierre Corneille
 Le Cid (opera), an 1885 opera in four acts by Jules Massenet
 El Cid (film), a 1961 film
 El Cid (TV series), a Spanish historical action drama web television series
 El Cid: The Legend, a 2003 Spanish animated film
 El C.I.D., a British TV series in the 1990s
 EL CID-week, the annual summer introduction week for new students at Leiden University, the Netherlands
 Raoul "El Cid" Hernandez, a character in the American TV series Oz
 El Cid Historic District in West Palm Beach, Florida
 El Cid, a restaurant and performance venue in Los Angeles, California; formerly called Cabaret Concert Theatre

See also
 CID (disambiguation)
 Cid (disambiguation)